Giac or GIAC may refer to:

 Global Information Assurance Certification, an information security certification entity.
 Giac (software), a C++ library that is part of the Xcas computer algebra system